Francis James Green (born 23 April 1980) is an English former professional footballer and sports co-commentator who works for BBC Radio Cambridgeshire.

Francis attended Farnborough School in Clifton, Nottingham. He has one younger sister. 

As a player he was a striker who played from 1998 to 2013 notably in the Football League for Peterborough United and Lincoln City. He also played professionally for Boston United, Macclesfield Town and Oxford United. He played in Non-League for Kettering Town, Brackley Town, Hucknall Town, Eastwood Town, Ilkeston, Spalding United, Corby Town and Basford United.

Career
Born in Nottingham, Green began his career at Ilkeston Town under the management of Keith Alexander, before going to Peterborough United. He made over 100 appearances for the Posh, before linking up with his former Ilkeston boss, Alexander, at Lincoln City in 2003. He left Lincoln in August 2006 to join Boston United (who he had joined on loan during the previous season). However, he could not prevent the Pilgrims suffering relegation from League Two at the end of the 2006–07 season. Green then left York Street in June 2007 to join Macclesfield Town on a two-year contract, where he again linked up with Alexander for the third time.

In July 2009, Green joined Conference National side Kettering Town, only to join Oxford United on loan in November 2009. This move was then made permanent in January 2010, though he was released shortly after the club secured promotion to the Football League in May of the same year.

In November 2011 he joined Hucknall Town on loan, with a view to making the transfer permanent when the transfer window opened in January 2012. However, in January, he instead joined Eastwood Town. At the end of March, with Eastwood facing financial problems, he opted to join Ilkeston on non-contract terms. He made seven appearances for the Robins in all competitions, helping the team achieve promotion from the Northern Premier League Division One South via the playoffs.

In June 2012, Green joined Spalding United and would score twice on his debut, a 4–2 home United Counties League Premier Division victory over A.F.C. Kempston Rovers on 18 August, but in early November was released from his contract. He moved on to join Hucknall Town but marked his debut by fracturing his fibula in the club's 5-0 Northern Premier League Division One South home defeat to Kidsgrove Athletic on 17 November 2012. Returning to fitness, Green joined Corby Town on 25 January 2013 and, having come on as a substitute, made a goalscoring debut for the club in their 6-1 Conference North defeat at Harrogate Town four days later.

On 28 October 2013, Basford United announced that Green had signed for the club.

Media career
Green now works as a co-commentator for BBC Radio Cambridgeshire on Peterborough United games.

References

External links

Profile at UpThePosh! The Peterborough United Database
Unofficial Francis Green Profile at The Forgotten Imp
Green joins Kettering

1980 births
Living people
Footballers from Derby
English footballers
Association football forwards
Ilkeston Town F.C. (1945) players
Peterborough United F.C. players
Lincoln City F.C. players
Boston United F.C. players
Macclesfield Town F.C. players
English Football League players
Kettering Town F.C. players
Oxford United F.C. players
Hucknall Town F.C. players
Northern Premier League players
Brackley Town F.C. players
Eastwood Town F.C. players
Spalding United F.C. players
Corby Town F.C. players
Ilkeston F.C. players
Basford United F.C. players